Shabaks are a group with a disputed ethnic origin. Some Shabaks identify themselves as a distinct ethnic group and others as ethnic Kurds. They live east of Mosul in Iraq. However their cultural traditions are different from Kurds and Arabs. Historically the Shabak can be identified as an ethnoreligious group. According to Shabak representatives, the Kurdish authorities intend to eliminate their culture and language, with concerns expressed over any new Kurdish language schools within Shabak villages. Their origin is disputed, and they are considered Kurds by some scholars. They speak Shabaki and live in a religious community (ta'ifa) in the Nineveh Plains. The ancestors of Shabaks were followers of the Safaviyya order, which was founded by the Kurdish mystic Safi-ad-din Ardabili in the early 14th century. The primary Shabak religious text is called the Buyruk or Kitab al-Manaqib (Book of Exemplary Acts), which is written in Turkmen.

Members of the three Kurdish tribes of Bajalan (or Bajarwans), Zangana and Dawoody live in the same villages as the Shabaks and are commonly mistaken for being Shabak.

Origins
The origins of the word Shabak are not clear. One view maintains that Shabak is an Arabic word  meaning intertwine, indicating that the Shabak people originated from many different tribes. Austin Henry Layard considered Shabak to be descendants of Kurds originating from Iran, and believed they might have affinities with the Ali-Ilahis. Anastas Al-Karmali also argued that Shabaks were ethnic Kurds. Another theory suggest that Shabaks originated from Anatolian Turkomans, who were forced to settle in the Mosul area after the defeat of Ismail I at the battle of Chaldiran.

Deportation and forced assimilation
After the 1987 census, the Iraqi regime started a revenge campaign against those Shabaks who chose to declare themselves Kurdish. The campaign included both deportation and forced assimilation and many of them (along with Zengana and Hawrami Kurds) were relocated to concentration camps (mujamma'at in Arabic) located in the Harir area of Kurdistan Region. An estimated 1,160 Shabaks were killed during this period. In addition, increasing efforts have been made to force the Shabak to suppress their own identity in favour of being Arab. The Iraqi government's efforts of forced assimilation, Arabization and religious persecution put the Shabaks under increasing threat. As one Shabak told a researcher: "The government said we are Arabs, not Kurds; but if we are, why did they deport us from our homes?" Shabak politician Salim al-Shabaki, a representative of Shabaks in the Iraqi parliament, said "The Shabaks are part of the Kurdish nation", emphasizing that Shabaks are ethnically Kurdish.

On 21 August 2006, Shabak Democratic Party leader Hunain Qaddo proposed the creation of a separate province within the borders of the Nineveh Plain to combat the Kurdification and Arabization of Iraqi minorities. On 20 December 2006, ten Shabak representatives unanimously voted for the non-inclusion of Shabak inhabited areas of the Mosul region into the Kurdistan Regional Government. A number of Shabak village aldermans noted that they were threatened into signing the incorporation petition by Kurdish authorities. On 30 June 2011, the Nineveh provincial council distributed 6,000 lots of land to state employees. According to the head of the Shabak Advisory Board Salem Khudr al-Shabaki, the majority of those lots were deliberately given to Arabs. Hunain al-Qaddo, a Shabak politician, was quoted by Human Rights Watch that: "The Peshmerga have no genuine interest in protecting his community, and that Kurdish security forces are more interested in controlling Shabaks and their leaders than protecting them."

Religious beliefs 
Shabaks regard themselves as Shia Muslims.

Shabaks combine elements of Sufism with their own interpretation of divine reality. According to Shabaks, divine reality is more advanced than the literal interpretation of Qur'an which is known as Sharia. Shabak spiritual guides are known as pirs, and they are well versed in the prayers and rituals of the sect. Pirs are under the leadership of the Supreme Head or Baba. Pirs act as mediators between divine power and ordinary Shabaks. Their beliefs form a syncretic faith similar to the beliefs of Yarsanism.

Shabaks also consider the poetry of Ismail I to be revealed by God, and they recite Ismail's poetry during religious meetings.

Settlements 
List of Shabak–majority settlements in the Nineveh Plains:

As of March 2019, all of the above settlements are under federal control and are disputed territories of Northern Iraq.

References

Further reading 
 Ali, Salah Salim. ‘Shabak: A Curious sect in Islam’. Revue des études islamiques 60. 2 (1992): 521-528.
 Ali, Salah Salim. ‘Shabak: A Curious sect in Islam’. Hamdard Islamicus 23. 2 (April–June 2000): 73-78.

 
Ethnic groups in Iraq
Iranian ethnic groups